Vaxholm Fortress is a historic fortification on the island of Vaxholmen in the Stockholm archipelago just east of the Swedish town of Vaxholm. The fortress is accessed by the Kastellet ferry, an electrically powered cable ferry across the channel from Vaxholm town. 

In 1970, it was used as a movie location for the pirate stronghold in Pippi in the South Seas.  A scenic view of the castle may be seen from the car ferry which plies the short distance between Vaxholm and the island Rindö.

History

The fortress was originally constructed by Gustav Vasa in 1548 to defend Stockholm against shipborne attacks from the east. This wooden blockhouse was replaced by a stone tower during Johan III's reign.  Most of the current structure dates from 1833–1863. Its design was inspired by the ideas on fortifications propounded by the French engineers Marc René Montalbert and Lazare Carnot. Russian prisoners-of-war were used in part to build the fortress. The stretch of water below the building was formerly the main sea route to Stockholm. Thus, the fortress was strategically situated to defend the city from naval attacks. The Danes attacked it in 1612 and the Russian navy in 1719. 

Since the mid-19th century, its military importance has ceased. So weak had the fort become that it was said the great Prussian field marshal von Moltke was only ever seen to smile twice – once when they told him his mother-in-law was dead and again when he saw Vaxholm Fort.

References

External links

 Vaxholm Fortress – Official site 
 Vaxholm Fortress at NortFort.ru 

Castles in Stockholm County
Forts in Sweden
Islands of Vaxholm Municipality
Islands of the Stockholm archipelago
Listed buildings in Sweden
Military and war museums in Sweden
Museums in Stockholm County
Uppland